A four flush (also flush draw) is a poker draw or non-standard poker hand that is one card short of being a full flush. Four flushing refers to empty boasting
or unsuccessful bluffing,
and a four flusher is a person who makes empty boasts or bluffs when holding a four flush.
Four flusher can also refer to a welcher, piker, or braggart.
This pejorative term originated in the 19th century when bluffing poker players misrepresented that they had a flush—a poker hand with five cards all of one suit—when they only had four cards of one suit.
Optimal strategies for bluffing or folding when holding a four flush have been explored extensively in poker strategy books.

In media

The first Governor of Oklahoma, Charles N. Haskell, denounced President and political opponent Theodore Roosevelt, calling him a "four flusher".

Metro Pictures released a comedy titled The Four-Flusher in 1919. Several other films have used the term in their titles.

In the 1922 Harold Lloyd silent film Dr. Jack the phrase "a four-flusher" is used to describe the doctor in charge of "The Sick-Little-Well-Girl" in the city.

The Four Flusher is the name of an American comedy written in 1925.

In the 1926 silent film The Show-Off, the character Clara (played by Louise Brooks) refers to the character Aubrey Piper (played by Ford Sterling) as a four-flusher meaning he is a braggart or a person who makes false or pretentious claims. In the film, his "four-flushing" has resulted in the loss of money needed to pay for the mortgage on the Fisher family home.

In the 1941 movie, Hellzapoppin' the character Pepi (played by Mischa Auer) is called a four flusher.

In the 1945 film Detour Tom Neal's character calls another character a four-flusher. (The other character is named Charlie Haskell Jr., echoing the name of the Oklahoma governor mentioned above.)

In the 1948 film Homecoming starring Clark Gable, one of the characters calls Gable's character a "four flusher".

Following his dismissal of Gen. MacArthur as Supreme Commander of Allied Powers in 1951, President Harry Truman confided to Merle Miller that Gen. George Marshall referred to MacArthur as a "four-flusher and no two ways about it".

A Popeye cartoon released in 1954 was titled "Floor Flusher", as a pun on four flusher.

In the 1967 Disney film The Jungle Book, Bagheera calls Baloo a "four-flusher" when he sees that Baloo is still alive after believing that he was dead.

The Doobie Brothers included the song "Double Dealin' Four Flusher" in their 1975 album Stampede.

The phrase was used frequently by screenwriter John Hughes as something of a trademark. In National Lampoon's Christmas Vacation, Clark refers to his boss as "four flushing" in his tirade over his corporate Christmas present. In Home Alone 2: Lost in New York, it is used by the mafia boss Johnny in the fictional film Angels with Even Filthier Souls. In Uncle Buck, a quite drunk Pooter the Clown calls Buck a four flusher when ordered to leave the family home, which results in Buck punching the clown right in the face.

In 2014 a screenplay by the name of FourFlush was written by Harley Evseichik

See also
Flush draw
Glossary of poker terms

References

External links

Poker gameplay and terminology